Harold "Hal" Van Every (February 10, 1918August 11, 2007) was an American football back in the National Football League who played 21 games for the Green Bay Packers.  In 1940, the Green Bay Packers used the 9th pick in the 1st round of the 1940 NFL Draft to sign Van Every out of the University of Minnesota.  Van Every went on to play for two seasons with the Packers and retired in 1941.

Van Every then joined the United States Army for World War II, then transferred to the Air Corps after six months, becoming a bomber pilot. He was assigned to 510th Squadron, 447th Bomb Group, Eighth Air Force, flying a Boeing B-17 Flying Fortress heavy bomber out of Rattlesden Air Base in England. On his ninth mission, his B-17 was shot down by flak on May 12, 1944. He was taken prisoner and sent to Stalag Luft III, arriving just after the famous "Great Escape". Near the end of the war, with the Russians closing in, the Germans marched their prisoners away from the camp. Finally, on April 29, 1945, the POWs were liberated by George S. Patton's Third Army.

References

http://packerville.blogspot.com/2007/08/packers-only-wwii-casualty.html

External links

1918 births
2007 deaths
American football defensive backs
American football halfbacks
Green Bay Packers players
Minnesota Golden Gophers football players
Second Air Force Superbombers football players
Shot-down aviators
United States Army Air Forces bomber pilots of World War II
World War II prisoners of war held by Germany
People from Hennepin County, Minnesota
Players of American football from Minnesota
Stalag Luft III prisoners of World War II
American prisoners of war in World War II
United States Army personnel of World War II
United States Army Air Forces officers
Military personnel from Minnesota